Biogeology is the study of the interactions between the Earth's biosphere and the lithosphere.

Biogeology examines biotic, hydrologic, and terrestrial systems in relation to each other, to help understand the Earth's climate, oceans, and other effects on geologic systems.

For example, bacteria are responsible for the formation of some minerals such as pyrite, and can concentrate economically important metals such as tin and uranium. Bacteria are also responsible for the chemical composition of the atmosphere, which affects weathering rates of rocks.

Prior to the late Devonian period, there was little plant life beyond lichens, and bryophytes. These large plants changed the atmosphere, and altered the composition of the soil by increasing the amount of organic carbon. This helped prevent the soil being washed away through erosion.

See also
Pedology
Geobiology

References

External links
 Biogeology department at the Institute of Paleobiology.
 American Geophysical Union (AGU) and Journal of Geophysical Research
 (JGR) - Biogeosciences
 European Geosciences Union (EGU) and Biogeosciences (BG)

Earth system sciences
Geobiology